The International Coordination Meeting of Youth Organisations (ICMYO) is an international network for the world's largest youth movements and regional youth platforms. It was founded officially in 2004, and further strengthened in 2013. The network claims to:
The organization is aimed to unite and represent the diverse voices of youth-led organisations globally, by providing a platform for coordination and cooperation in order to have a stronger influence on global youth policy processes and to achieve full partnerships between youth organisations and relevant stakeholders. 
The main objectives of ICMYO are: 
- To represent the diverse voices of youth-led organisations globally
- Cooperation among youth-led organisations at regional and global levels
- Coordination of political inputs to global youth policy

Currently, the network meets once a year in an annual meeting which is organised by a task force elected the year before by the members.

Members
There are two types of full member and two types of associate membership (there are no associate members at the moment).

Regional Youth Platforms

International Non-Governmental Youth Organisations

See also
Youth voice
Youth participation

References

External links
 ICMYO Website

Youth empowerment organizations
International nongovernmental youth organizations